Lenke Jacsó-Kiss (born 8 October 1951) is a Hungarian basketball player. She competed in the women's tournament at the 1980 Summer Olympics.

References

External links
 

1951 births
Living people
Hungarian women's basketball players
Olympic basketball players of Hungary
Basketball players at the 1980 Summer Olympics
People from Szarvas
Sportspeople from Békés County